Memorial High School is a comprehensive public high school in Millville in Cumberland County, New Jersey, United States, operated as part of the Millville Public Schools. The school was built in 1925 and used as the Millville High School from 1925-1964 until the Millville Senior High School was built.  Currently it is being used as a Junior High School to house the ninth grade and half of the tenth grade.

Students from Woodbine attend the district's high schools as part of a sending/receiving relationship. Maurice River Township students also attend the district's high schools, as part of a sending/receiving relationship with the Maurice River Township School District. Commercial Township and Lawrence Township also send students to the district's high schools; The four sending districts filed suit in 2009, challenging the way in which the Millville district charges for students from outside the district to attend the school.

As of the 2021–22 school year, the school had an enrollment of 526 students and 53.0 classroom teachers (on an FTE basis), for a student–teacher ratio of 9.9:1. There were 284 students (54.0% of enrollment) eligible for free lunch and 32 (6.1% of students) eligible for reduced-cost lunch.

History
The school is a memorial to those who lost their lives in World War I; there were 20 Millville residents who died during their service during the war. A bronze plaque next to the school's auditorium states that the school was "Dedicated in Memory of the Men from Millville who made the Supreme Sacrifice in the World War.".

Millville High School is the home of the Millville Thunderbolts.

In 2016 the school board decided to create a single principal position for all high school students as it had plans to consolidate the two high schools.

As part of a $110 million expansion project overseen by the New Jersey Schools Development Authority and scheduled to start in 2017, the capacity of Millville High will be doubled to accommodate up to 2,300 students, allowing all freshmen and sophomore classes that had been at Memorial High School to be consolidated at the Senior High School building.

References

External links
Memorial High School web pages
Millville Public Schools

School Data for the Millville Public Schools, National Center for Education Statistics

Millville, New Jersey
Public high schools in Cumberland County, New Jersey
School buildings completed in 1925
1925 establishments in New Jersey